The Fillon law of 2005 was a law that was adopted in France in April 2005 which would reform France's education system. It is named after François Fillon, the Minister of Education at the time.

Aims of the law
 Introduction of a core knowledge for certain subjects. This includes French, mathematics, a foreign language, humanistic and scientific culture, communication and information. This excludes arts subjects from its core knowledge. 
 Three hours of support for the teachers
 Abolition of travaux personnels encadrés, guided personal projects combining various subjects, research and free study

Public reaction
The new law was met with significant backlash from students. On 5 February 2005, hundreds of thousands of students demonstrated against the law by refusing to go to school or by marching. Notable players in the protests were Samuel Morville and Pauline Salingue, who were to be arrested.

External links
senat.fr (archived copy)

François Fillon
Law of France
2005 in law
2005 in France